Li Xiu (李秀), also known as Yang Niang and Li Shuxian (李淑贤), was a Chinese military commander during the Jin Dynasty. 

She was the daughter of Li Yi, a military commander in charge of the Ningzhou area (present-day Jinning County in Yunnan) during the reign of Emperor Hui. 

Her father suddenly died in 303 CE during a rebellion in the area, and Li Xiu inherited his post soon after. Taking his place as military commander, she held Ningzhou while under siege, rallying the area several times against the rebels, until completely defeating the revolt seven years after. 

The Jin and Tang administrations awarded her several titles after the war for her service, and the people of Ningzhou renamed her former base "Citadel of the Heavenly Lady".

References 

291 births
Jin dynasty (266–420) generals
Women in ancient Chinese warfare
Women in 4th-century warfare
Year of death unknown
Women in war in China
Chinese female generals
4th-century Chinese women
4th-century Chinese people